Melissa Luburich Bean (born January 22, 1962) is an American politician who served as the U.S. representative for  from 2005 to 2011. Bean is a member of the Democratic Party.

Early life, education, and business career
Bean attended Maine East High School before graduating from Oakton Community College with an associate degree in 1982 and from Roosevelt University in 2002 with a bachelor's degree. Prior to her election to Congress, she was president of a home-based business, Sales Resources Inc.

U.S. House of Representatives

Elections
2002
In 2002, Bean ran against 73-year-old 8th District Republican incumbent Phil Crane, a 33-year incumbent. Bean attacked Crane for taking numerous lobbyist-funded trips. She lost, but gained 43% of the vote. This was unexpected since she had received very little funding from the national party. The 8th had historically been the most Republican district in the Chicago area, and by some accounts was the most Republican district in all of Illinois. Bean's performance was even more notable since the 8th had reportedly been redrawn to protect Crane.

2004
Bean sought a rematch against Crane in 2004. During the campaign, Bean raised almost as much money as Crane, mostly from individual donors, whereas Crane's money came mostly from political action committees. Her strong showing in 2002 led the national party to pump a large amount of money into her campaign. Bean was endorsed by the Daily Herald, the Chicago Tribune and the Chicago Sun-Times—the three major newspapers in her district.

Faced with having to campaign for what was previously thought to be a safe seat, the Republicans tried their best to keep Crane in office. However, on November 2, 2004, Bean defeated Crane with 52% of the vote. Although George W. Bush during the 2004 presidential election won the district with 56% of the vote, Bean was helped by US Senate candidate Barack Obama, who carried the district. She is the first Democrat to represent the district since its formation in 1935. (The district was numbered the 10th District from 1935 to 1949, the 13th from 1949 to 1973, the 12th from 1973 to 1993 and has been the 8th since 1993.)

2006

In 2006, Bean's seat was seen by Republicans as winnable due to her freshman status, the 8th district's historical Republican tilt, and George W. Bush' 2004 presidential vote margin. Most of the district's state representatives and state senators were Republicans. In much of the district, Bean was the only elected Democrat above the county level. Bean's reelection became a top priority of the Democratic Congressional Campaign Committee (DCCC).

Bean faced the winner of a competitive six-candidate Republican primary, David McSweeney, in the general election. As in 2004, Bean was endorsed by all three of the major newspapers in her district. She defeated McSweeney, 51% to 44%.

2008

Bean decisively defeated her 2008 opponent, businessman Steve Greenberg. Although she was one of forty-four Democrats in the House who voted to condemn the MoveOn.org group for their controversial "General Betray-us" ad in 2007, he criticized her for accepting over $80,000 in campaign donations from them three years earlier. Bean defeated Greenberg, 60% to 40%.

2010

Bean was challenged by Republican nominee Joe Walsh and Green Party nominee Bill Scheurer. Although Bean was heavily favored, she lost to Walsh by only 291 votes. Bill Scheurer received 6,400 votes, which far exceeded Walsh's margin of victory.

Bean was endorsed by the Chicago Tribune, the Chicago Sun-Times, The Daily Herald, and the Lake County News-Sun.

Tenure
Bean was a member of the Blue Dog Coalition and the New Democrat Coalition.

Bean was a member of the Small Business and Financial Services committees for her entire House tenure. Normally, House Democrats who serve on the Financial Services Committee cannot serve on any other committee. However, Bean was granted a waiver by the Democratic leadership.

Bean's business and financial record includes opposing a bill that would have allowed for drilling for oil in Lake Michigan which is a large source of drinking water for her district. She has departed from the Democrats in voting in May 2006 to extend about $70 billion in tax cuts (she was one of just 15 Democrats to back the legislation), voting to permanently reduce the estate tax, and voting in favor of a presidential line-item veto. Similarly, she is one of only 15 Democrats to vote in favor of the Central American Free Trade Agreement (CAFTA). In 2009, she voted for the American Recovery and Reinvestment Act of 2009 and the American Clean Energy and Security Act. She was a co-sponsor of the Employee Free Choice Act.

On other issues, Bean opposed President Bush's troop "surge" in Iraq. In a February 2006 speech given before the surge had been fully implemented, Bean said, "regrettably, this surge does not constitute a new course." On social issues, Bean is pro-choice and voted in support of Health Care and Education Reconciliation Act of 2010, health care reform. Bean was one of four Democrats to vote against the James Zadroga 9/11 Health and Compensation Act of 2010, joining 155 of 159 Republicans, blocking the vote (which needed a 2/3 majority to pass, as it was brought to vote under a motion to suspend rules).

Committee assignments
Committee on Financial Services
Subcommittee on Capital Markets, Insurance and Government Sponsored Enterprises
Subcommittee on Financial Institutions and Consumer Credit
Committee on Small Business
Subcommittee on Finance and Tax
Subcommittee on Contracting and Technology
Subcommittee on Regulations, Healthcare and Trade

Electoral history

After Congress
In 2011, Bean became President and CEO of the Executives Club of Chicago. After serving as chair of Midwest operations for JPMorgan Chase, she became CEO of Mesirow Wealth Advisors, part of Mesirow Financial, in 2019.

Personal life
Bean lives in unincorporated Palatine Township with her husband and two children. Their residence was in the 8th District when they moved there, but became part of the 10th District because of redistricting. They lived in an adjoining district for her entire time in Congress. Bean is Serbian Orthodox.

See also
 Women in the United States House of Representatives

References

External links 

 
Profile at SourceWatch

1962 births
Living people
Female members of the United States House of Representatives
People from Barrington, Illinois
Politicians from Chicago
Roosevelt University alumni
American people of Serbian descent
Women in Illinois politics
Democratic Party members of the United States House of Representatives from Illinois
21st-century American politicians
21st-century American women politicians
Eastern Orthodox Christians from the United States